Kingweston Meadows is an 11.5 hectare (28.4 acre) biological Site of Special Scientific Interest at Kingweston in Somerset, notified in 1990.

This site is an excellent example of an unimproved herb-rich neutral grassland of a type which is now rare in Britain.

References 

Sites of Special Scientific Interest in Somerset
Sites of Special Scientific Interest notified in 1990
Meadows in Somerset